Belvedere Park is a park in Belvedere, California, between San Rafael Avenue and Community Road. The park includes a large playground and a field. This park is also noted for its rich grass.

Uses 
The park features a recently renovated playground as well as a baseball field, batting cage, soccer field, and two basketball courts. There is also a community center hosting programs for children such as ballet and basketball. During the summer, the City of Belvedere hosts the Concerts in the Park series, showcasing performances by musicians from all over the world.

Parks in Marin County, California
Municipal parks in California